A Day in the City (subtitled Six Jazz Variations on a Theme) is the debut album by pianist Don Friedman recorded in 1961 and released on the Riverside label.

Reception

The AllMusic review by Scott Yanow stated: "Friedman's playing (which shows the strong influence of modern classical music, particularly in its chords) rewards repeated listenings".

DownBeat critic Pete Welding had this to say about A Day in the City in his April 26, 1962, review: "Friedman is a pianist of extraordinary ingenuity and originality. Friedman will strike most listeners as a spiritual cohort of Bill Evans, for their approaches are markedly similar."

Track listing 
All compositions by Don Friedman

Personnel 
Don Friedman – piano
Chuck Israels – bass
Joe Hunt – drums

References 

1961 albums
Don Friedman albums
Riverside Records albums